The 2007–08 Basketball League Belgium Division I, for sponsorship reasons named 2007–08 Ethias League, was the 81st season of the Basketball League Belgium, the highest professional basketball league in Belgium. Spirou Charleroi won the 2008 national title, their seventh total title.

Regular season

Play-offs
The play-offs start on May 13 and ended on May 31, 2008. In the quarterfinals and semifinals a best-of-three format was used, in the finals a best-of-seven format.

References

External links
2007–08 season on Eurobasket.com

Basketball League Belgium Division I seasons